Toni Piispanen (born 24 July 1976) is a Paralympic athlete for Finland. He started as an able-bodied karate competitor and became disabled due to an accident that injured his spinal cord at a karate show in 1993. This accident occurred in Lahti in front of hundreds of spectators. After that he played Wheelchair rugby for fifteen years before switching to wheelchair racing in 2008. He is a world record holder in his classification. At the 2012 Summer Paralympics he won gold in the men’s T-51 class 100-metre wheelchair sprint.

References 

Paralympic athletes of Finland
Athletes (track and field) at the 2012 Summer Paralympics
Paralympic gold medalists for Finland
1976 births
Living people
World record holders in Paralympic athletics
Medalists at the 2012 Summer Paralympics
World Para Athletics Championships winners
Paralympic medalists in athletics (track and field)
Athletes (track and field) at the 2020 Summer Paralympics